Zdenka Vučković (June 20 Zagreb, 1942 - 7 March 2020) was a Croatian popular music singer with over 60 years of career. Her popularity peaked during 1960s, when she was a teenagers' pop star. She is best remembered for the songs Moja mala djevojčica ["My Little Girl"], best known by the line Tata, kupi mi auto ["Daddy, Buy Me a Car"] and Zagreb, Zagreb, which became an unofficial anthem of the Croatian capital. Her voice is made familiar by the song  ["Bunny and the Stream"]. She announced the end her musical career with the song with a symbolic name Odrasla je djevojčica mala [The Little Girl has Grown Up] performed at the 1989 . She still continued singing. In particular in 1991 she performed the song "To Love Somebody" (a song by Bee Gees, in Croatian) in duet with Severina; the song was performed by Zdenka Vučković 20 years earlier and was named "The Interpretation of the Year".  In 2010 she performed the song Veslaj ["Row!"] in duet with Luka Nizetic at Split Festival in 2010.

In 1971 she married composer , who was her life partner and personal composer since 1950s.

References

External links

1942 births
2020 deaths
20th-century Croatian women singers

hr:Zdenka Vuckovic